Limenitis homeyeri is a butterfly found in the East Palearctic that belongs to the browns family.

Subspecies
L. h. homeyeri Amur
L. h. venata Leech, [1892]   Sichuan, Shaanxi
L. h. meridionalis Hall, 1930   Yunnan
L. h. sugiyamai    Yoshino, 1997   North Sichuan, Shaanxi, Hubei

Description from Seitz

L. homeyeri Tancre (57c) is somewhat more narrow-winged than the previous forms [sydi, camilla, helmanni, doerriesi], but very similar lo them, being more delicately marked. The middle spots of the discal row of the forewing as in doerriesi project less distally, the band of the hindwing however is anteriorly narrower and there is a row of distinct venata. small white spots in the marginal area of the hindwing. Amur, Ussuri. — venata Leech (57c) is a larger form of a darker tint, with the white markings enlarged, which is especially evident with the cell -streak of the forewing and the band of the hindwing. On the underside too the ground has a deeper colour, the markings are silky white, the band of the hindwing being sharply traversed by the black veins. South -East and West China.

Etymology
The name honours Eugen Ferdinand von Homeyer.

See also
List of butterflies of Russia

References

Limenitis